Amomyrtus is a genus of flowering plants in the myrtle family, Myrtaceae described as a genus in 1948. It is native to temperate southern South America, where it is distributed in Chile and Argentina.

These plants produce large, white flowers with abundant pollen and fleshy black fruits containing one to three seeds. The plants are self-compatible.

Species
Species

References

Myrtaceae
Myrtaceae genera
Flora of South America
Taxa named by Max Burret